Paramispila bispecularis is a monotypic genus of beetle in the family Cerambycidae. Its sole species is Paramispila bispecularis. It was described by White in 1858.

References

Pteropliini
Beetles described in 1858